City College Coventry was a further education college based in the city of Coventry, England. It was formed in 2002 through the merger of two previous colleges in the city, although through them it has roots going back to the 19th century. It was one of three further education colleges within the city boundaries, alongside Henley College and Hereward College. The college caters for 12,000 students and occupies a purpose-built campus in the Swanswell area of Coventry.  In 2017 City College merged with Henley College to form Coventry College.

History
The origins of Coventry College can be traced back to the 19th Century, with the Mechanics’ Institution. Formed in 1829 to educate young weavers, it provided lessons in writing, arithmetic, geometry, geography, grammar, and music. In 1835, an Anglican minority withdrew from the institution to form the Religious & Useful Knowledge Society; the two were reunited in 1855, becoming the Coventry Institute. In 1888, the Coventry Institute merged with another body, the Technical Institute, and became the Technical College under the Education Act 1902. The home of the Technical College at The Butts was built in 1935 and opened by the Duke of York, who would later become King George VI. However, the need for a higher technical training in Coventry resulted in the Lanchester College of Technology being built in 1961, which would ultimately become Coventry University.

The Technical College was later renamed the Coventry Technical College, and merged with Tile Hill College in 2002 to create City College Coventry. It was officially launched by former Coventry teacher and then Education Secretary Estelle Morris. The merger resulted in two constituent sites, and the former colleges were renamed to The Butts Centre (Coventry Technical College) and Tile Hill Centre (Tile Hill College). The latter was later demolished in 2008.

In 2007, the college began the move to a new purpose-built complex in the Swanswell area of the city, with the transferral of courses from and the closure of the Tile Hill Centre. In January 2009, staff and students from The Butts Centre moved in, and the £53m complex was officially opened later that year.

In 2011 a merger was proposed between the college and the nearby Warwickshire College.

2013 Ofsted inspection
An Ofsted inspection in March 2013 deemed the college 'inadequate', criticising the quality of teaching, leadership and management, as well as low course completion rates and poor attendance. The three inspection categories, 'Outcomes for learners', 'Quality of teaching, learning and assessment' and 'Effectiveness of leadership and management' were all awarded the lowest rating Oftsed awards, prompting the resignation of the principal, Paul Taylor, in May 2013.  Re-inspection in June 2014 saw the college receive an Ofsted grade 3 rating.

Campus

The complex is sited on land previously occupied by modern flats designed for residents with disabilities.

Structure and organisation

Governance
City College Coventry is run by the Corporation, the governing body of the college. There are five committees that comprise the Corporation, with one each specialising in governance, finance and resources, quality and performance, estates, and audits respectively.

Steve Logan was appointed in July 2013, following the resignation of the previous principal Paul Taylor. In December 2015, Steve Logan resigned preceding the release of the college's Ofsted report (in which the college was graded inadequate).

Dr Elaine McMahon was principal from January 2016 until the creation of the new merged college.

Schools
City College Coventry comprises six schools:
School of Business, Science, Access & HE
School of Construction
School of Creative & Digital Industries
School of Engineering
School of English, Maths and Foundation Studies
School of Health

Partnerships
The college has partnerships with the University of Warwick and Coventry City F.C.

Teaching profile
The college offers a range of qualifications including GCSEs, BTECs, and HNDs. The teaching of A levels ceased in September 2013.

In 2010 the Quality Assurance Agency for Higher Education stated that "confidence in the College's management of its responsibilities, as set out in its partnership agreements" for the standard of both the awards the college gives and the learning opportunities the college provides.

In 2011, a poll of 2,000 students in the annual Learner Feedback – First Impressions survey found that 98 per cent were satisfied with their course.

The college's student radio station was SynergyFM, which later closed down.

References

External links
 Coventry College - Official website
 Ofsted and Lesson Observations - Now Ofsted’s Leadership & Management Section Includes A Reference To Observations

Education in Coventry
Buildings and structures in Coventry
Further education colleges in the West Midlands (county)
Educational institutions established in 2002
2002 establishments in England